Jerzy Stanisław Milian (April 10, 1935 – March 7, 2018) was a Polish jazz musician, painter, composer and vibraphonist. At sixteen he graduated from the Secondary School of Music in Poznan. His teachers were Wolfram Heicking and Bogusław Schaeffer.

Career 
In the years 1953-1955 , Milian formed a quintet with Stanisław Chwiłkowski, Ryszard Czaplicki, Jerzy Piątek and Stanisław Lisek. In the years 1956–1958, he played vibraphone in a sextet with Krzysztof Komeda, and at the turn of 1959 and 1960 in the quintet of  Jan "Ptaszyn" Wróblewski. He was the director and artistic director of the Orchestra of Polish Radio and Television Services Entertainment in Katowice and lecturer at the Poznan Academy of Music. He participated in many jazz festivals, including the annual Jazz Jamboree in Warsaw.

He was a jury member at the Soviet Song Festival in Zielona Gora, The XII Soviet Song Festival, in 1976.

Personal life
In the years 1950-1957, he was a member of the ZMP. From 1961, he belonged to the Polish United Workers' Party. Awarded with the Knight's Cross of the Order of the Rebirth of Polish, Gold Cross of Merit and badge for distinguished cultural activists. He died on March 7, 2018, at the age of 82.

In 2004, he was awarded the Commander's Cross.

Selected Discography

Singles and EP 
 Instrumental ensemble of Jerzy Milian (Pronit SP 440)
 1961 Quintet Jorge Milian (Polskie Nagrania Muza N 0164)

Solo albums 
 1969  Dance music  (Polish Recordings - Pronit XL, SXL 0791)
 1969  Baazaar , Jerzy Milian Trio (Polskie Nagrania Muza)
 1975  Jerzy Milian Amusement Polish Radio and Television Orchestra in Katowice  (Polskie Nagrania Muza SX 1278)
 1978  Orchestra of Polish Radio and Television in Katowice Amusement Conductor: Jerzy Milian  (Polskie Nagrania Muza - Pronit SX 1543)
 2003  Ashkhabad Girl  (OBUH Records V23)
 2005  Milianalia  (OBUH Records V27, Polskie Nagrania Muza)
 2012 'When Where Why' '(GAD Records CD 005)
 2013  Blues for Prague  (GAD Records CD 007)
 2013  Stratus Nimbus  (GAD Records CD 009)
 2015  Semiramide  (GAD Records CD 024)
 2015  Milian 80  (GAD Records CD 026)
 2016  Rivalen  (GAD Records CD 037)

Albums with Jerzy Milian 
 1973  Jerzy Milian - Ballet Music and Film  (Polskie Nagrania Muza SXL 0950)

Bibliography 
  http://www.kppg.waw.pl/ 
  https://www.discogs.com/artist/96804-Jerzy-Milian

References

External links 
 
 Jerzy Milian in portal Culture.pl

1935 births
2018 deaths
Polish jazz composers
Male jazz composers
Polish jazz musicians
Jazz vibraphonists
Musicians from Poznań
Recipient of the Meritorious Activist of Culture badge